Washington's 15th legislative district is one of forty-nine districts in Washington state for representation in the state legislature.

The district takes up the eastern half of Yakima County.

This semi-rural district is represented by state senator Nikki Torres and state representatives Bruce Chandler (position 1) and Bryan Sandlin (position 2), all Republicans.

See also
Washington Redistricting Commission
Washington State Legislature
Washington State Senate
Washington House of Representatives

References

External links
Washington State Redistricting Commission
Washington House of Representatives
Map of Legislative Districts

15